The following is a sortable listing of comedy and variety television programs which include LGBTQ+ cast members.

Comedy and variety programs

References

Comedy
Cast members